Daniel Benítez may refer to:
 Daniel Benítez (Paraguayan footballer) (born 1979)
 Daniel Benítez (Venezuelan footballer) (1987–2021)
 Dani Benítez (born 1987), Spanish footballer